Jared Thomas Goff (born October 14, 1994) is an American football quarterback for the Detroit Lions of the National Football League (NFL). He played college football at California, where he set the Pac-12 Conference season records for passing yards and passing touchdowns, and was selected first overall by the Los Angeles Rams in the 2016 NFL Draft.
 
After an unsuccessful rookie season, Goff rebounded in his second year when he helped lead the Rams to their first winning season in 14 years and their first playoff appearance in 13 years. Goff oversaw further improved fortunes for the Rams in 2018, which saw the team reach Super Bowl LIII, the franchise's first Super Bowl appearance since 2001. He also received Pro Bowl honors in both seasons. Amid a production decline during his next two years, Goff was traded to the Lions in 2021.

Early life
Goff was born in San Rafael, California and raised in Novato, California, the son of Jerry Goff, a former Major League Baseball player. He also has an older sister named Lauren. Goff grew up as a San Francisco 49ers fan and wears the number 16 as a tribute to Joe Montana, who played for the 49ers before Goff was born.
 
Goff attended Marin Catholic High School in Kentfield, California, and graduated in 2013. He played for the football team, throwing for 7,687 yards and 93 touchdowns with 18 interceptions in three varsity seasons at Marin Catholic, completing 477-of-767 passes (62.2%), equal to a passer rating of 125.5, for teams that combined to post a 39–4 overall record and 21–0 Marin County Athletic League mark on their way to an appearance in the state title game, one North Coast Section crown, three NCS playoff appearances, and three MCAL championships.

College career
Goff was recruited by a number of college programs and received scholarship offers from Boise State, Fresno State, and Washington State before choosing to attend the University of California, Berkeley. Goff was a mid-year enrollee at Cal in January 2013 and joined the Golden Bears for 2013 spring practices. In August, he was named starting quarterback for the 2013 season over redshirt freshman quarterback Zach Kline, becoming the first true freshman quarterback in Cal history to start a season opener.
 
Goff set 26 Cal records. This included passing yards (12,220), passing yards per game (329.7 ypg), touchdown passes (96), completions (977), passing attempts (1,569), total offense (12,086), and total plays (1,739). He is second only to Aaron Rodgers on Cal's all-time list for passing efficiency (143.95).

2013 season

Under new head coach Sonny Dykes, Goff started all twelve games in the 2013 season, and although the team finished 1–11, he set Cal single-season records for passing yards (3,508), yardage gained (3,508), total offense (3,446), passes completed (320), and passes attempted (530). Goff finished his true freshman season with a 60.3 completion percentage with 18 touchdown passes and 10 interceptions.

2014 season
In 2014, Goff was again the starting quarterback for the Golden Bears. In a September 27 matchup against the Colorado Buffaloes, Goff threw a career-high seven touchdown passes, completing 24-of-42 passes for 458 yards. On October 4, Goff threw for a new career-high and school-record 527 yards and five touchdowns in a 60–59 victory over Washington State. Goff helped lead the Golden Bears to a 5–7 season, a four-win improvement over the 2013 season. He finished the 2014 season with 3,973 yards, 35 touchdowns, and a 62% completion rate, once again setting new school records.

2015 season
In 2015, as a junior, Goff led the Bears to a 7–5 regular-season finish, clinching Cal's first winning season since 2011. Going into the season, Goff was projected as the top quarterback for the 2016 NFL Draft by Mel Kiper Jr. and Todd McShay. On November 14, 2015, Goff threw for 453 yards and six touchdowns in a 54–24 victory over Oregon State, earning Pac-12 Offensive Player of the Week honors for the first time. Two weeks later, Goff set a new Cal single-game record with 542 passing yards in a 48–46 come-from-behind victory over Arizona State, earning Player of the Week honors for a second time. In the 2015 Armed Forces Bowl, Goff threw for six touchdown passes and 467 yards, leading the Bears to a 55–36 victory over Air Force.
 
In 2015, Goff set a new Pac-12 single-season passing-yardage record (4,714), and also set a new conference record for touchdown passes in a season (43). He earned first-team All-Pac-12 honors. He was the first Cal quarterback to earn first-team All-Pac-12 honors since Rodgers in 2004 while leading an 8–5 Cal team to a winning record and bowl game for the first time since 2011 as well as a post-season win for the first time since 2008.
 
During Goff's time as quarterback, the Golden Bears never beat an in-state rival, going 0–9 against Stanford, UCLA, and USC, and they also went 0–3 against division rival Oregon. Goff's father has been quoted as saying the lack of a marquee win bothered his son. Goff majored in sociology during his time at Cal.
 
After his junior season, Goff announced his decision to forgo his senior season and enter the 2016 NFL Draft.

Statistics

Professional career

In mid-February 2016, most analysts had Goff projected to be selected in the early first round of the draft, with the second overall pick of the Cleveland Browns being his most frequently predicted landing spot, or the San Francisco 49ers with the seventh overall pick. Despite not excelling at the physical tests at the NFL Scouting Combine, Goff still improved his draft stock with a strong showing in the positional drills. Goff also reportedly scored a 36 on his Wonderlic exam.

Los Angeles Rams
Goff was selected first overall by the Los Angeles Rams in the 2016 NFL Draft. The Rams had traded up in the first round and acquired the first pick from the Tennessee Titans. Goff was the second Rams quarterback to be taken first overall in six years; the Rams had selected Sam Bradford first overall six years earlier.

2016 season: Rookie year

On June 9, 2016, Goff signed a four-year deal worth $27.9 million in guaranteed money, including an $18.6 million signing bonus.
 
On November 15, Goff was named the Rams' starting quarterback for the game against the Miami Dolphins after spending the first nine games as the backup to veteran quarterback Case Keenum. Goff started the final seven games of the season. On November 20, 2016, he made his professional debut and first NFL start against the Dolphins and completed 17-of-31 attempts for 134 yards in the 14–10 loss. The following week against the New Orleans Saints, he threw his first career touchdown on a 24-yard completion to wide receiver Tavon Austin in the first quarter and had his first career interception in the third quarter after being picked off by Saints safety Kenny Vaccaro. Goff finished the 49-21 road loss completing 20-of-32 completed passes for 214 yards, three touchdowns, and an interception in a 49–21 loss.
 
During a Week 14 42–14 loss to the Atlanta Falcons, Goff completed 24 of 41 passes for 235 yards and two interceptions. He also had his first NFL rushing touchdown on a two-yard run in the fourth quarter.
 
In his rookie season, Goff made seven starts. The Rams lost each of those games finishing with an overall record of 4–12. Goff completed 112-of-205 passes for 1,089 yards, five touchdowns, and seven interceptions to go along with 16 rushing yards and a touchdown.

2017 season

Goff entered the season with a new head coach in Sean McVay. In the season-opener against the Indianapolis Colts, Goff achieved his first professional victory while completing 21-of-29 passes for 306 yards and a touchdown. His performance against the Colts marked his first career game with at least 300 passing yards. Two weeks later against the San Francisco 49ers, Goff completed 22-of-28 passes for 292 yards and three touchdowns, leading the Rams to a narrow 41–39 road victory. During a Week 4 35–30 road victory over the Dallas Cowboys, Goff completed 21-of-36 passes for 255 yards and two touchdowns. In the next game against the Seattle Seahawks, Goff notably struggled, as he had two interceptions, no touchdowns, 288 yards, and a 46.8 completion percentage for a 48.9 passer rating as the Rams lost 10–16. The following week against the Jacksonville Jaguars, Goff threw for 124 yards and a touchdown in a 27–17 road victory. During a Week 7 33–0 shutout victory over the Arizona Cardinals at Twickenham Stadium, he passed for 235 yards, a touchdown, and an interception. Two weeks later against the New York Giants at MetLife Stadium, Goff threw for 311 yards and four touchdowns as the Rams won by a score of 51–17, earning him NFC Offensive Player of the Week. During Week 10 against the Houston Texans, Goff finished with 355 passing yards and three touchdowns as the Rams won 33–7. In the game, he threw a 94-yard touchdown pass to Robert Woods. Two weeks later against the New Orleans Saints, Goff finished with 354 passing yards, two touchdowns, and an interception as the Rams won 26–20. In Week 14, Goff played against the Philadelphia Eagles, going up against 2016 second overall pick Carson Wentz. Although he completed 16-of-26 attempts for 199 yards and two touchdowns, Goff fumbled the ball in the last minute, resulting in a 43–35 loss. In the next game against the Seahawks, he completed 14 of 21 passes for only 120 yards and two touchdowns as the Rams won on the road by a score of 42–7. The following week against the Tennessee Titans, Goff finished with 301 passing yards and four touchdowns in the 27–23 road victory. With the win, the Rams clinched the NFC West for the first time since 2003. As a result, Goff sat out of the regular-season finale against the 49ers.

Goff finished his second professional season with 3,804 passing yards, 28 touchdowns, and seven interceptions to go along with 51 rushing yards and a touchdown in 15 games and starts. He led the league in yards per pass completion with 12.9. On January 6, 2018, Goff played in his first playoff game. He completed 24-of-45 passes for 259 yards and a touchdown in a 26–13 Wild Card Round loss to the Atlanta Falcons. On January 22, 2018, he was named to his first Pro Bowl as an injury replacement for Carson Wentz. Goff was ranked 38th by his fellow players on the NFL Top 100 Players of 2018.

2018 season

Goff started the 2018 season throwing for 233 yards and two touchdowns in a 33–13 road victory over Oakland Raiders in the season opener, followed by back-to-back 354 yard games in wins over Arizona Cardinals and the cross-town rival Los Angeles Chargers. In the Chargers game, he also had a career best 80.5% completion percentage on 29–36 passing for three touchdowns and one interception. During a Week 4 38–31 victory over the against the Minnesota Vikings, Goff completed 26 of 33 passes for a career-high 465 yards and five touchdowns, finishing with a perfect quarterback rating of 158.3. His performance set the record for most passing yards and attempts while maintaining a perfect passer rating, surpassing Ken O'Brien's 32 attempts for 431 yards in 1986. Goff was named the NFC Offensive Player of the Week for his performance. Goff was later named the NFC Offensive Player of the Month for September. Against the Kansas City Chiefs in Week 11, Goff threw for over 400 yards and four touchdowns as the Rams defeated the Chiefs 54–51 on Monday Night Football in the third-highest-scoring NFL game in history. Three weeks later against the Chicago Bears, Goff threw for 180 yards, no touchdowns, and a career-high four interceptions as the Rams lost on the road by a score of 15–6. Goff ended the season by throwing for 199 yards and four touchdowns in a 48–32 victory over the San Francisco 49ers, and finished 2018 with 4,688 yards, the second-highest single-season total in franchise history, and his 32 touchdown passes were the third-highest total among Ram quarterbacks, trailing only Hall of Famer Kurt Warner in both categories. He was selected to his second straight Pro Bowl for his performance in 2018.

The Rams finished the 2018 season atop the NFC West with a 13–3 record and made the playoffs with a first-round bye as the #2 seed. In the Divisional Round against the Dallas Cowboys, he finished with 186 passing yards as the Rams won 30–22. In the NFC Championship against the New Orleans Saints, he passed for 297 yards, a touchdown, and an interception as the Rams defeated the Saints on the road in overtime by a score of 26–23. Although the team was aided by a controversial no-call by the officials, Goff was also clutch in several key plays, and became the youngest quarterback to win an NFC Championship Game.
 
Goff and the Rams advanced to Super Bowl LIII to face the New England Patriots. The game which was largely dominated by both sides' defenses, and Goff completed 19 of 38 passes for 229 yards and threw a costly interception to Stephon Gilmore late in the fourth quarter of the 13–3 loss. The Rams tied the 1971 Miami Dolphins in Super Bowl VI for the fewest points in Super Bowl history in the loss. Goff was ranked 32nd by his fellow players on the NFL Top 100 Players of 2019.

2019 season

On April 23, 2019, the Rams picked up the fifth-year option on Goff's contract. Five months later, he agreed to a four-year extension worth $134 million featuring $110 million guaranteed, at the time, it was an NFL record for the most guaranteed money in a contract, surpassed by Patrick Mahomes in 2020.
 
Goff helped lead the Rams to a 3–0 start with victories over the Carolina Panthers, New Orleans Saints, and Cleveland Browns. During a Week 4 55–40 loss to the Tampa Bay Buccaneers, Goff finished with a career-high 517 passing yards, two touchdowns, and three interceptions. He tied the NFL record for completions in a regular-season game with 45 equalling Drew Bledsoe's Week 11 performance against the Minnesota Vikings in 1994. In the next game against the Seattle Seahawks, Goff threw for 395 yards, a touchdown, and an interception in the narrow 30–29 road loss. The following week against the San Francisco 49ers, Goff threw for a career-low 78 passing yards in the 20–7 loss. During a Week 7 37–10 road victory over the Atlanta Falcons, he helped stop the Rams' three-game losing streak with 268 passing yards and two touchdowns in the 37–10 victory. In the next game against the Cincinnati Bengals in London, Goff threw for 372 yards and two touchdowns in the 24–10 victory. During a Week 13 34–7 road victory over the Arizona Cardinals, Goff threw for 424 yards and two touchdowns. He won the NFC Offensive Player of the Week award for his performance. Three weeks later during a 49ers rematch on Saturday Night Football, Goff finished with 323 passing yards, two touchdowns, and an interception as the Rams narrowly lost on the road by a score of 34–31 and were eliminated from playoff contention. In the regular season finale against the Cardinals, Goff threw for 319 yards and three touchdowns during the 31–24 win. Goff finished the 2019 season with 4,638 passing yards, 22 touchdowns, and 16 interceptions to go along with 40 rushing yards and two touchdowns in 16 games and starts as the Rams finished with a 9–7 record. Goff's 394 pass completions set a single season franchise record at the time.

2020 season

During the season-opener against the Dallas Cowboys, the first ever football game to be played at SoFi Stadium, Goff finished with 275 passing yards and an interception as the Rams won 20–17. In the next game against the Philadelphia Eagles, Goff threw for 267 yards and three touchdowns to tight end Tyler Higbee during the 37–19 road victory. The following week against the Buffalo Bills, Goff finished with 321 passing yards, two touchdowns, and an interception as the Rams narrowly lost on the road by a score of 35–32. The Rams overcame a 28–3 deficit to lead 32–28 before giving up the go-ahead score toward the end of the game. During a Week 11 27–24 road victory over the Tampa Bay Buccaneers, Goff threw for 376 yards, three touchdowns, and two interceptions. Two weeks later against the Arizona Cardinals, he had 351 passing yards and a touchdown in a 38–28 road victory. During Week 16 against the Seattle Seahawks, Goff threw for 234 yards and an interception before leaving the eventual 20–9 road loss with a broken thumb in the third quarter. As a result, he was forced to miss the regular-season finale against the Arizona Cardinals. Goff finished the 2020 season with 3,952 passing yards, 20 touchdowns, and 13 interceptions to go along with 99 rushing yards and four touchdowns in 15 games and starts.
 
In the Wild Card Round against the Seahawks, Goff was cleared to play but began the game as the backup to John Wolford. Goff came in the game during the first quarter after Wolford left the game with a neck injury. In the game, Goff completed nine of 19 passes for 155 yards and a touchdown as the Rams won on the road by a score of 30–20. In the Divisional Round against the Green Bay Packers, Goff completed 21 of 27 passes for 174 yards and a touchdown in the 32–18 road loss.

Detroit Lions

2021 season
 
On March 18, 2021, Goff, a first round pick in both 2022 and 2023, and a 2021 third round pick were traded to the Detroit Lions in exchange for quarterback Matthew Stafford.

Goff made his Lions debut in the season-opener against the San Francisco 49ers. He finished the game completing 38 of 57 passes for 338 yards, three touchdowns, and an interception returned for a touchdown as the Lions lost 41–33 despite a late rally. During a Week 7 matchup against his former team, the Los Angeles Rams, Goff threw for 268 yards, a touchdown, and two interceptions as the Lions lost on the road by a score of 28–19. During this game, Goff suffered an oblique injury, leaving Tim Boyle to start in Week 9. In the Lions' Thanksgiving game against the Chicago Bears, Goff threw for 171 yards and two touchdowns in the narrow 16–14 loss. In the next game against the Minnesota Vikings, he threw for 296 yards, three touchdowns, and an interception as the Lions narrowly won 29–27, snapping the Lions’ 15–game losing streak. Goff was named NFC Offensive Player of the Week for his performance. The game also marked Goff's first win without head coach Sean McVay, having been a combined 0–16–1 in games with a different head coach. Goff and the Lions went on to win three of their last four games, including the Vikings victory, one against the Arizona Cardinals, and a surprising season finale victory over the Green Bay Packers to finish with a 3–13–1 record.

Goff finished his first season with the Lions with 3,245 yards, 19 touchdowns, and eight interceptions to go along with 87 rushing yards in 14 games and starts, missing three games due to an injury and being on the COVID-19 reserve list.

2022 season
 

In the season-opener against the Philadelphia Eagles, Goff threw for 215 yards and two touchdowns, but threw an interception returned for a touchdown as the Lions narrowly lost by a score of 38–35. In the next game against the Washington Commanders, he threw for 256 yards and four touchdowns in a 36–27 victory. In the Week 2 game against Washington, Goff produced his sixth straight home game with two or more passing touchdowns, establishing a Lions franchise record. On October 2, Goff again threw four touchdowns passes, and this time added a tenure-high 378 passing yards during a 48–45 loss to the Seattle Seahawks. Goff finished his second season with the Lions with 4,438 yards, 29 touchdowns, and seven interceptions, starting in all 17 games. Goff was named to his third Pro Bowl as an alternative, replacing Super Bowl bound Jalen Hurts.

NFL career statistics

Regular season

Postseason

Awards and records

Lions franchise records
 Most consecutive passes without an Interception: 324
 Most consecutive home games with at least two touchdown passes: 6
 Highest toudown-interception ratio: 4.14
 Highest completion percentage in a single season: 67.2% (2021) (tied with Matthew Stafford (2015))
 Highest single season passer rating: 99.2% (2022) (tied with Matthew Stafford (2017))
 Lowest interception percentage in a single season: 1.2% (2022)

Rams franchise records
 Most completed passes in a single game: 45 (September 29, 2019)
 Most 4th quarter comebacks in a single season: 4 (2018) (tied with Norm Van Brocklin (1955), Jim Everett (1989), Marc Bulger (2003), and Sam Bradford (2012))

NFL awards
 NFC Champion (2018)
 3× Pro Bowl (2017, 2018, 2022)
 PFWA Most Improved Player (2017)
 4x FedEx Air Player of the Week – Week 16, 2017, Week 15, 2021, Week 4, 2022, Week 14, 2022
 4x NFC Offensive Player of the Week – 2017 (Week 9), 2018 (Week 4), 2019 (Week 13), 2021 (Week 13)
 NFC Offensive Player of the Month – September 2018

Personal life
Goff's father, Jerry Goff, is a former Major League Baseball player. In 2016, Goff appeared as a guest on the Outdoor Channel's Gridiron Outdoors, which is hosted by former Cal football quarterback Mike Pawlawski.
 
Goff has an enzyme deficiency that does not allow his body to break down proteins. Among the difficulties it creates is an inability to process red meat.
 
In the summer of 2019, Goff launched his own line of clothing called "JG16". In March 2020, he donated $250,000 to the Los Angeles Regional Food Bank during the coronavirus pandemic.

On February 2, 2022, Goff appeared on the Tiny Meat Gang Podcast, where host Cody Ko lied to Goff about being investors together in Friday Beers. 

He got engaged to longtime girlfriend  Christen Harper on June 16, 2022.

See also
 NFL quarterbacks who have posted a perfect passer rating
 List of Division I FBS passing yardage leaders
 List of first overall National Football League draft picks

References

External links

 Detroit Lions bio
  
 
 

 

1994 births
Living people
American football quarterbacks
California Golden Bears football players
Detroit Lions players
Los Angeles Rams players
National Conference Pro Bowl players
National Football League first-overall draft picks
People from Novato, California
Players of American football from California
Sportspeople from the San Francisco Bay Area